Tubuca alcocki is a species of fiddler crab. Its range includes most of the northern Indian Ocean, from western Thailand (facing
the Andaman Sea), through the Bay of Bengal and India, to the Red Sea.

Etymology
The specific name alcocki is in honor of Alfred William Alcock, the naturalist who recorded the species from India and Pakistan as Uca urvillei.

Description 
Carapace and legs brown or dark brown. Major cheliped with fingers white in adults and orange in young. Females with orange cheliped with blue tinge. Carapace of male is trapezoidal, smooth with distinct, narrow median groove. Anterolateral margin is acutely triangular. Major cheliped with dactylus usually longer than palm. Carapace of female is also trapezoidal. Anterolateral margin broadly triangular.

Ecology
It is a mangrove species which lives sympatric with Austruca annulipes, Austruca bengali, Tubuca forcipata, Tubuca paradussumieri and Austruca iranica.

References 

Ocypodoidea
Crustaceans of the Indian Ocean
Crustaceans described in 1852